Webster Bluff is an ice-covered bluff with a steep, rocky north face, 9 nautical miles (17 km) long, forming a northern extension of the Phillips Mountains in Marie Byrd Land. Mapped by United States Geological Survey (USGS) from surveys and U.S. Navy air photos, 1959–65. Named by Advisory Committee on Antarctic Names (US-ACAN) for David O. Webster, ionospheric physicist at Byrd Station, 1964.

Features
Mount Peddie

References

Cliffs of Marie Byrd Land